The 2019 Wartburg Knights football team represented Wartburg College as a member of the American Rivers Conference (ARC) during the 2019 NCAA Division III football season. There, the Knights defeated  in the first round before losing to eventual national runner-up, in the second round. The team played home games at Walston-Hoover Stadium in Waverly, Iowa.

Schedule
Wartburg's 2019 regular season scheduled consisted of five home and five away games.

References

Wartburg
Wartburg Knights football seasons
Wartburg Knights football